Odontiomorpha is a genus of leaf beetles in the subfamily Eumolpinae. It is distributed in South Africa.

Species
 Odontiomorpha capensis Zoia, 2011
 Odontiomorpha cuprina Zoia, 2011
 Odontiomorpha minuta Jacoby, 1900
 Odontiomorpha spinipennis Zoia & Grobbelaar, 2011

References

Eumolpinae
Chrysomelidae genera
Beetles of Africa
Endemic beetles of South Africa
Taxa named by Martin Jacoby